There have been a number of battles known as the Battle of Saint Quentin, most of which were fought in the vicinity of Saint-Quentin, Aisne in Picardy, France.

 Battle of St. Quentin (1557), Savoy-Spanish victory over the French in the Habsburg-Valois Wars
 Battle of St. Quentin (1871), during the Franco-Prussian War
 Battle of St. Quentin (1914), also known as the Battle of Guise, between French and German forces
 Battle of St. Quentin (1918), part of the German Spring Offensive Operation Michael
 Battle of Mont Saint-Quentin, attack at Mont St. Quentin near Péronne by the Australian Corps in August 1918
 Battle of St Quentin Canal, attack by the British Fourth Army on the Hindenburg Line in September 1918

See also
Battle of the Canal du Nord